Euchloe lucilla, the lemon white, is a small butterfly of the family Pieridae, the yellows and whites.  The butterfly is found in India.

See also
Pieridae
List of butterflies of India
List of butterflies of India (Pieridae)

References
 
  
 
 
 

Euchloe
Butterflies of Asia
Butterflies described in 1886